Ken Montour (born September 9, 1979 in Six Nations of the Grand River First Nation) is a former professional box lacrosse player in the National Lacrosse League. Montour played 8 seasons in the NLL, most of them with the Buffalo Bandits.

During the 2009 NLL season, he was named a starter to the All-Star Game and was also named NLL Goaltender of the Year.

During the 2010 season, Montour was hit by Toronto Rock defender Drew Petkoff and suffered a concussion. Montour finished the game but has not played since. He has also missed all but one half-day in his job as a teacher.

Statistics

NLL

Awards

References

1979 births
Living people
Arizona Sting players
Buffalo Bandits players
Canadian lacrosse players
First Nations sportspeople
Iroquois nations lacrosse players
Lacrosse people from Ontario
National Lacrosse League All-Stars
National Lacrosse League major award winners
Philadelphia Wings players
Columbus Landsharks players